Russell Treyz (born 1940) is an American regional theater director and co-writer of the musical Cotton Patch Gospel. He won the Drama Desk Award in 1972 for his play Whitsuntide.

Personal background 
He graduated from Princeton University and the Yale School of Drama.

References

Drama Desk Award winners
1940 births
Living people
Princeton University alumni
Yale School of Drama alumni